Earl Martin is a former member of the Ohio House of Representatives, succeeded by Matt Lundy. He is the son of Mayor Earl Martin of Rocky River, Ohio. Former Representative Martin operates Martin's Deli in Bay Village, Ohio and Avon, Ohio. His son serves in the United States Marines.

References 

Members of the Ohio House of Representatives
Living people
21st-century American politicians
Year of birth missing (living people)